Filthy Note Records was a record label that concentrated on rock and metal bands. Filthy Note was founded by Bam Margera in 2006.

History
The label was launched in United States in 2006. It was formed after creator Bam Margera saw the band Vains of Jenna play at a club in Hollywood.
After seeing Vains of Jenna play, Margera instantly realized he needed to create a record label and get the music he liked heard.
He offered to sign Vains of Jenna to the label, which they agreed to.

Since then, Bam has also signed English heavy metal band, Viking Skull, of which his brother Jess, is the drummer for.
The band was flown to Margera's estate and recorded their album Chapter Two at his home studio.

He also signed rock band The Moxy and since then Bam has directed their music video for the song Step Down and the band have released a 5-song EP.

2011
The record label has been closed by Bam. The website went down in late 2010 and was never brought back online.

Signed bands
The Moxy
Vains of Jenna
Viking Skull

See also
 List of record labels

External links
http://filthynote.com - domain has expired.
http://myspace.com/filthynote

American record labels
Record labels established in 2006
Rock record labels